The Tri-State Highway was the designation for an 18 mile expressway in the Chicago metropolitan area.  The original designations for the expressway were Interstate 80, 90, and 294, as well as a portion of U.S. Route 6.  It connects the Tri-State Tollway, Bishop Ford Freeway, and Illinois Route 394 in the west to the Indiana Toll Road in the east.

In 1953, the Tri-State Highway was renamed.  The road that was once part of the Tri-State Highway is now:
 The Kingery Expressway in Illinois
 The Borman Expressway in Indiana

References 

Transportation in Gary, Indiana